The 1950 Virginia Cavaliers football team represented the University of Virginia during the 1950 college football season. The Cavaliers were led by fifth-year head coach Art Guepe and played their home games at Scott Stadium in Charlottesville, Virginia. They competed as independents, finishing with a record of 8–2.

Schedule

References

Virginia
Virginia Cavaliers football seasons
Virginia Cavaliers football